John Napier (1550–1617) was a Scottish mathematician, physicist and astronomer.

John Napier may also refer to:

John Light Napier (born 1947), U.S. Representative from South Carolina
John Napier (bobsleigh) (born 1986), American bobsledder
John Napier (cricketer) (1859–1939), English clergyman and cricketer
John Napier (designer) (born 1944), theatre set designer, recipient of many Tony and Olivier awards
John Napier (footballer) (born 1946), Irish-born footballer and manager, notably with Bradford City A.F.C.
John R. Napier (1917–1987), primatologist from the University of London, founder of the Primate Society of Great Britain
Sir John Napier, 4th Baronet (1636–1711), English landowner and politician

See also
Jack Napier (disambiguation)